Sheikha Hassa bint Mohammed bin Khalifa Al Nahyan (17 June 1922 – 28 January 2018) was the first wife of the founder and the first President of the United Arab Emirates, the Emir of Abu Dhabi, Sheikh Zayed bin Sultan Al Nahyan.

She was the mother of the former president of UAE and emir of Abu Dhabi, Sheikh Khalifa II ( 7 September 1948 – 13 May 2022 ). Her father was Sheikh Mohammed bin Khalifa Al Nahyan, who was a first cousin of her husband and also was a senior figure of the House of Al Nahyan, until his death in 1979. Her mother was Sheikha Hassa bint Saqr Al Nahyan, who was also another first cousin of Sheikh Zayed himself. Therefore, Sheikha Hassa bint Mohammed and her husband Sheikh Zayed were double first cousins once removed.

Ancestry

References

Sources

1922 births
2018 deaths
Hassa
People from Abu Dhabi
Spouses of presidents of the United Arab Emirates